Wildflowers is the debut album by Canadian country music artist Cassandra Vasik. It was released by Epic Records in 1991. The album includes the Top 5 single "Which Face Should I Put on Tonight."

Track listing
All songs written by Tim Thorney and Erica Ehm

"The Black Book"
"Burning Witches"
"Which Face Should I Put On Tonight"
"When Will I Become a Man"
"It Comes Back to You"
"Those Stars"
"Fading Footsteps"
"Painted Cafe"
"Wildflowers"
"I Walk Alone"
"Innocence"
"Talk Around Me"

References

External links
[ Wildflowers] at Allmusic

1991 debut albums
Cassandra Vasik albums
Epic Records albums